The Trilogy of Fallot also called Fallot's trilogy is a rare congenital heart disease consisting of the following defects: pulmonary valve stenosis, right ventricular hypertrophy and atrial septal defect. It occurs in 1.2% of all congenital heart defects.

A 1960 case report of 22 patients who underwent surgery showed an excess of females with a ratio of 3:2, with the youngest person being 7 months old and the oldest being 50 years old.

Symptoms and signs

Mechanism
Trilogy of Fallot is a combination of three congenital heart defects: pulmonary stenosis, right ventricular hypertrophy, and an atrial septal defect.

The first two of these are also found in the more common tetralogy of Fallot. However, the tetralogy has a ventricular septal defect instead of an atrial one, and it also involves an overriding aorta

The Three Malformations

Diagnosis

Diagnosis is done via echocardiography or angiography.

Treatment
It is treated using surgery to repair the atrial septal defect and pulmonary stenosis, once the pulmonary stenosis has been fixed the right ventricular hypertrophy will usually go away on its own.

Balloon valvuloplasty is the most common treatment for pulmonary stenosis, a balloon is placed where the artery or valve is narrowed and is inflated, widening the artery or valve in the process, the balloon is then removed. It may cause valve regurgitation. If balloon valvuplasty is not an option open heart surgery must be performed where the valve is either repaired or replaced with an artificial one.

History
It is named in honor of its discoverer: Etienne Fallot.

References

Congenital heart defects